Leslie Richards (born April 3, 1967) is the current General Manager of SEPTA, the public transportation agency serving the Philadelphia area. She previously served as a member of the Montgomery County Board of Commissioners and as Secretary of the Pennsylvania Department of Transportation, from 2015 to 2019 under Governor Tom Wolf.

Personal life and education
Richards earned a bachelor's degree in economics and urban studies from Brown University, and a master's degree in regional planning from the University of Pennsylvania. She has three children with her husband, Ira: Rebecca, Benjamin, and Sophie.

Career
Richards was elected to the Whitemarsh Township Board of Supervisors in 2007, and became chairwoman of the board in 2008.

Richards was elected to the Montgomery County Board of Commissioners in 2011. Her election, along with that of fellow Democrat Josh Shapiro, marked the first time in over a century that Democrats controlled the Montgomery County Board of Commissioners. Richards served as Montgomery County's representative on the Delaware Valley Regional Planning Commission. Richards also serves on the board of SEPTA.

Pennsylvania political operatives had mentioned Richards as a potential Congressional candidate in Pennsylvania's 6th congressional district. Richards declined to run for the seat after incumbent Congressman Jim Gerlach retired in 2014.

In 2015, following the election of Democratic Governor Tom Wolf, Richards was nominated to serve as Secretary of Transportation of Pennsylvania. She was subsequently confirmed by the Pennsylvania State Senate in May 2015.

In 2017, Richards was appointed the first female chair of the Pennsylvania Turnpike Commission as well as the Public Private Partnership (P3) Board.

On November 21, 2019, Richards was named as SEPTA's new General Manager, replacing Jeff Knueppel in January 2020.

Awards

References

External links
PennDOT Biography
Twitter account

Living people
SEPTA general managers
Montgomery County Commissioners (Pennsylvania)
Pennsylvania Democrats
State cabinet secretaries of Pennsylvania
1973 births
Brown University alumni
University of Pennsylvania School of Design alumni